Melrose Resources plc was an independent upstream oil and gas E&P company founded in 1992, it was first listed on the London Stock Exchange in 1999.  The company was headquartered in Edinburgh, UK with international offices in the countries where its operations were located.  Its activities were focused on Egypt, Bulgaria, France, Romania, Turkey and the United States.

The company merged with Petroceltic International in 2012.

History
The Company was formed in 1992 by Robert Adair to exploit international oil opportunities. It was first listed. In 2004 the company successfully developed the Galata gas field in Bulgaria. In 2006, the company acquired Merlon Petroleum, an oil business with which it shared interests in Egypt.

In October 2012,  Melrose Resources merged with Dublin-based Petroceltic International plc in a share for share deal worth $222m, this added new exploration assets in Algeria, Kurdistan and Italy to the existing Melrose portfolio and formed an enlarged oil and gas exploration and production company.  Petroceltic was acquired by Worldview Capital Management, a Cayman Island based financial fund in June 2016.

References

External links
 Official site
 Melrose Resources to target Black Sea

1992 establishments in Scotland
Companies based in Edinburgh
Non-renewable resource companies established in 1992
Oil and gas companies of Scotland
Non-renewable resource companies disestablished in 2012
2012 disestablishments in Scotland
2012 mergers and acquisitions